Acácio is both a masculine Portuguese given name and a surname. Notable people with the name include:

People with the given name
Acácio Casimiro (born 1949), Portuguese footballer
Acácio (footballer) (born 1959), Brazilian footballer and manager
Acácio da Silva (born 1961), Portuguese cyclist
Acácio de Almeida (born 1938), Portuguese cinematographer
Acácio Mesquita (1909–1945), Portuguese footballer
Acácio Pereira Magro (1932–2018), Portuguese academic, economist and politician
Acácio Rodrigues Alves (1925–2010), Brazilian Roman Catholic bishop

People with the surname
Adrião Acácio da Silveira Pinto (died 1868), Governor of Macau
Daniel Acácio (born 1977), Brazilian mixed martial artist
Marlon Acácio (born 1982), Mozambican judoka

Portuguese-language surnames
Portuguese masculine given names